The UK Permanent Secretary to the Treasury is the most senior civil servant at HM Treasury. The post originated as that of Assistant Secretary to the Treasury in 1805; that office was given new duties and renamed in 1867 as a Permanent Secretaryship.

The position is generally regarded as the second most influential in His Majesty's Civil Service; Andrew Turnbull (Permanent Secretary from 1998 to 2002)  and Gus O'Donnell (2002–2005) were Permanent Secretaries to the Treasury who then became Cabinet Secretary, the  most influential post.

Previous incumbents have not always maintained the political neutrality expected of civil servants; in 1909 Sir George Murray was involved in lobbying various Crossbench peers in the House of Lords to reject the Chancellor of the Exchequer's proposed budget. In 2014, during the Scottish Independence referendum campaign, Sir Nicholas Macpherson broke with convention by publishing private advice to Chancellor of the Exchequer George Osborne. The decision to publish was later criticised for compromising the impartiality of the Civil Service.

Assistant Secretaries to the Treasury
George Harrison (1805–1826)
William Hill (1826–1828)
James Henry Keith Stewart (1828–1836)
Alexander Spearman (1836–1840)
Sir Charles Trevelyan (1840–1859)
George Alexander Hamilton (1859–1867)

Permanent Secretaries to the Treasury
George Alexander Hamilton (1867–1870)
Sir Ralph Lingen (1870–1885)
Sir Reginald Welby (1885–1894)
Sir Francis Mowatt (1894–1903) (jointly from 1902)
Sir Edward Hamilton (1902–1908) (joint)
Sir George Murray (1903–1911) (jointly until 1908)
Sir Robert Chalmers (1911–1913) (joint)
Sir Thomas Heath (1911–1916) (joint)
Sir John Bradbury (1913–1919) (joint)
Sir Robert Chalmers (1916–1919) (joint)
Sir Warren Fisher (1919–1939)
Sir Horace Wilson (1939–1942)
Sir Richard Hopkins (1942–1945)
Sir Edward Bridges (1945–1956)
Sir Norman Brook (1956–1962) (jointly until 1959 and from 1960)
Sir Roger Makins (1956–1959) (joint)
Sir Frank Lee (1960–1962) (joint)
Sir William Armstrong (1962–1968) (jointly until 1963 and from 1968)
Sir Laurence Helsby (1962–1968) (joint)
Sir Douglas Allen (1968–1974) (jointly until 1968)
Sir Douglas Wass (1974–1983)
Sir Peter Middleton (1983–1991)
Sir Terence Burns (1991–1998)
Sir Andrew Turnbull (1998–2002)
Sir Gus O'Donnell (2002–2005)
Sir Nicholas Macpherson (2005–2016)
Sir Tom Scholar (2016–2022)
James Bowler (2022-Present)

Since March 2009, Sir Tom Scholar had served as the Treasury's Second Permanent Secretary. The post of Head of the Government Economic Service had been held by Sir Nicholas Stern (now Lord Stern of Brentford) until June 2007, since when it has been jointly held by Vicky Pryce, Chief Economic Adviser and Director General of Economics at BIS(until 2010), and Dave Ramsden, Managing Director, Macroeconomic and Fiscal Policy Directorate.

References

David Butler and Gareth Butler, Twentieth Century British Political Facts 1900–2000, Macmillan 2000, p. 306.

HM Treasury
Civil Service (United Kingdom)
Civil service positions in the United Kingdom
1805 establishments in the United Kingdom